Dunham is a toponymic surname of English origin, deriving from several places named Dunham (from Old English: dun- hill, -ham home).

Variations
Variations in spelling of surname Dunham are found across England, including: in Kent, Denham; in Devonshire and Nottingham, Douham; in Norfolk, Downham; and in Dorsetshire, Dynham.

List of people
Individuals with the surname Dunham include: 
 Ann Dunham, anthropologist and pioneer in the field of microfinance in Southeast Asia for whom the Ann Dunham Soetoro Endowed Fund at the University of Hawaii is named, mother of U.S. President Barack Obama and Maya Soetoro-Ng
 Archie W. Dunham, former President and Chief Executive Officer of Conoco Inc., and Horatio Alger Award recipient
 Cyrus L. Dunham, American Civil War Colonel, U.S. Representative from Indiana
 Emma Bedelia Dunham (1826–1910), American poet, teacher
 Grace Dunham, American poet
 Jack Dunham, American animator and producer
 Jack Dunham (psychologist)
 Jason L. Dunham, United States Marine Corps Corporal and Medal of Honor awardee for whom the destroyer USS Jason Dunham (DDG-109) is named 
 Jeff Dunham, American ventriloquist and prop-comedian
 Jeremiah Dunham Botkin, U.S. Representative from Kansas
 Joanna Dunham (1936-2014), British actor
 Jonathan Singletary Dunham, Member of the New Jersey Provincial Congress
 Katherine Dunham, American choreographer
 Sir Kingsley Charles Dunham, British geologist
 Kurt Dunham, Australian professional snooker player
 Lena Dunham, New York-based filmmaker
 Madelyn Lee Payne Dunham, grandparent of U.S. President Barack Obama who helped in raising him as a child in Honolulu, Hawaii
 Mark Wentworth Dunham, known for the introduction and breeding of Percheron horses in America
 Mike Dunham, American ice hockey player
 Ransom W. Dunham, U.S. Representative from Illinois
 Stanley Armour Dunham, grandparent of U.S. President Barack Obama who helped in raising him as a child in Honolulu, Hawaii
 Stephen Dunham (1964-2012), American actor
 William Dunham (mathematician)
 William D. Dunham (1920-1990), American military flying ace
 William Riley Dunham (1856-1921), American politician, member of the Indiana General Assembly

In fiction
 Olivia Dunham, FBI agent on TV series Fringe''

See also
 Dunham (disambiguation)

References

English-language surnames